EF-hand domain family member D2 is a protein that in humans is encoded by the EFHD2 gene.

References

Further reading 

EF-hand-containing proteins